Metopomuscopteryx is a genus of bristle flies in the family Tachinidae.

Species
Metopomuscopteryx fatigantis Reinhard, 1958
Metopomuscopteryx incurata Reinhard, 1958
Metopomuscopteryx tibialis (Coquillett, 1902)

References

Diptera of North America
Dexiinae
Tachinidae genera
Taxa named by Charles Henry Tyler Townsend